"On the Wrong Side" is a song by American vocalist and guitarist Lindsey Buckingham from his eponymous seventh solo studio album Lindsey Buckingham. It was released on July 23, 2021, as the second single ahead of the album's release in September 2021.

"On the Wrong Side" was one of the five songs from the album that he played on his accompanying tour. Buckingham also performed the song on Late Night with Stephen Colbert on September 16, 2021, one day before the release of Buckingham's eponymous album.

This is the second Buckingham song titled "On the Wrong Side". His first was recorded for the 1994 With Honors soundtrack.

Background
"On the Wrong Side" is both musically and lyrically inspired by Buckingham’s former band Fleetwood Mac, which Buckingham left in 2018. The song details the long and eventful relationship between him and the band as well as the ups and downs of life on the road.

According to Buckingham, the song "evokes 'Go Your Own Way,' in that it's not a happy song, subject-matter wise, but it was an ebullient song musically. This was sort of the same idea." He noted that the connection between the two songs can be found in their tones, vocal deliveries, and guitar solos.

Release history

References

2021 singles
2021 songs
Lindsey Buckingham songs
Songs written by Lindsey Buckingham